Microtis rara, commonly known as the scented onion orchid, is a species of orchid endemic to Australia, with the exception of the Northern Territory. It has a single hollow, onion-like leaf and up to fifty small green or yellowish-green, scented flowers. It is similar to Microtis oblonga and some authorities regard the two as being one species.

Description
There are dark green calli in the centre of the labellum. Flowering occurs from November to January and is stimulated by fire the previous summer.

Taxonomy and naming
Microtis rara was first formally described in 1810 by Robert Brown and the description was published in Prodromus Florae Novae Hollandiae et Insulae Van Diemen. The specific epithet (rara) is a Latin word meaning "scarce", "scattered" or "dispersed".

Some authorities regard Microtis oblonga as being a race of M. rara.

Distribution and habitat
The scented onion orchid grows swamps and wet forests and is widespread but not common, occurring in all states but not the Northern Territory.

References

External links
 

rara
Endemic orchids of Australia
Orchids of New South Wales
Orchids of Queensland
Orchids of South Australia
Orchids of Victoria (Australia)
Orchids of Western Australia
Orchids of Tasmania
Plants described in 1810